is a Japanese enka singer, former J-pop singer, and actress.

Early life 
Nagayama was born in Tokyo.  At the age of four, she began attending min'yo group singing lessons with her father.  Although she originally went because she enjoyed the attention from her father's classmates, she soon began studying and performing min'yo together with her father.  When she was ten, she started playing shamisen.  Her father gave her a shamisen that she still uses today.

She is married to American entrepreneur Mark Smith, president of IT staffing firm Skillhouse Staffing Solutions.

J-pop era 
Nagayama continued singing and performing through her junior high school years.  Her plan was to become a professional enka singer after finishing junior high school.  However, when she was sixteen, her handlers told her and her parents that she was too young to sing enka.  Despite her father's wishes, she then decided to become a J-pop idol singer.

Her debut song was Haru wa SA-RA SA-RA (春はSA-RA SA-RA), released in 1984.  It was not well received, nor were her releases over the next two years.  However, in 1986, Nagayama had her first big hit with a cover version of British girl group Bananarama's dance-pop take on Shocking Blue's Venus. Her next song, You're My Love, was also popular.  Five of her songs (Venus, You're My Love, Kanashiki Koibitotachi, Heart ni Hi o Tsukete, and Hangyaku no Hero) were all Oricon top 10 hits.

During this time, Nagayama also performed in various dramas, such as the jidaigeki Sanbiki ga Kiru!, Minipato yori Ai o Komete, and Yūwaku.

Enka era 
In 1993, she started a second career as an enka singer.  She received three prizes for her first enka song Higurashi (蜩). Suterarete (捨てられて) also became famous.

Nagayama continues to play the shamisen in many of her songs.  Notable songs with shamisen parts are Jonkara Onnabushi (じょんから女節) and Usoda to Itte (噓だといって), the latter having been posted on YouTube under the title "DEATH BY SHAMISEN".

She regularly presents enka programmes on Japanese TV. Nagayama has had at least one song appear on the NHK program Minna no Uta. In 1993, she made her first appearance on the NHK New Year's Eve spectacular Kōhaku Uta Gassen.  Since 1995, she has performed at "Kōhaku" for 13 consecutive years, making a total of 14 appearances to date.

On April 6, 2009 she announced on her blog that she has married American entrepreneur Mark Smith.

Discography

Enka Singles 
 蜩 (Higurashi) c/w 心だけでも．．．(Kokoro Dake Demo...) January 21, 1993
 海に降る雪 (Umi ni Furu Yuki) c/w 道しるべ (Michishirube) February 6, 1993
 なみだ酒 (Namidazake) c/w 艶花 (Tsuyabana) September 22, 1993
 蒼月 (Tsuki) c/w あんただけ (Anta Dake) September 3, 1994
 めおと酒 (Meotozake) c/w 綾の女 (Aya no Onna) May 10, 1994
 私が生まれて育ったところ (Watashi ga Umarete Sodatta Tokoro) c/w 硝子坂 (Garasu Saka) January 21, 1995
 捨てられて (Suterarete) c/w ふたたびの恋 (Futatabi no Koi) March 24, 1995
 倖せにしてね (Shiawase ni Shite ne) c/w いけない女 (Ikenai Onna) February 21, 1996
 ヨコハマ・シルエット (Yokohama Silhouette) c/w 嘘だといって (Uso Da to Itte) June 21, 1996
 たてがみ (Tategami) c/w ふられ酒 (Furarezake) July 11, 1996
 たてがみ「劇場版」 (Tategami – Gekijōban) c/w 紅い雪 (Akai Yuki) January 22, 1997
 お江戸の色女 (Oedo no Iroonna) c/w 夏ひとり (Natsu Hitori) April 23, 1997
 あの頃のなみだは (Ano Koro no Namida wa) c/w 地図のない旅 (Chizu no Nai Tabi) April 23, 1997
 ムーンライトジェラシー (Moonlight Jealousy) June 11, 1997
 浪花夢情話（新編桂春団治） (Naniwa Yume Jōwa) June 11, 1997
 恋のプラットホーム (Koi no Platform) c/w 洋子のズンドコ節 (Yōko no Zundokobushi) January 13, 1998
 父さんの詩 (Tōsan no Uta) c/w 港町メルヘン (Minatomachi Märchen) March 21, 1998
 桶屋の八つぁん (Okeya no Yatsan) c/w 新宿たずね人 (Shinjuku Tazune Hito) February 5, 1998
 花園しぐれ (Hanazono Shigure) c/w 恋酒場 (Koi Sakaba) November 13, 1998
 傘 (Kasa) c/w 深川恋キツネ (Fukagawagoi Kitsune) March 24, 1999
 さだめ雪 (Sadame Yuki) c/w 女の花詞 (Onna no Hanakotoba) April 8, 1999
 なみだ酒 (Namidazake) / めおと酒 (Meotozake) December 16, 1999
 蜩 (Higurashi) / 蒼月 (Tsuki) December 16, 1999
 むすばれたいの (Musubaretai no) c/w 遠い街 (Tōi Machi) January 1, 2000
 恋酒場 (Koi Sakaba) c/w あずさ川 (Azusagawa) April 21, 2000
 紅い雪 (Akai Yuki) c/w 縁むすび (Enishi Musubi) January 11, 2000
 遠野物語 (Tōno Monogatari) c/w 幾春別川 (Kishun Wakaregawa) May 17, 2001
 めぐり逢い (Meguriai) c/w やどり木夫婦 (Yadorigi Fūfu) March 21, 2002
 艶姿女花吹雪 (Adesugata Onna no Hanafubuki) c/w 妻という名じゃなくっても (Tsuma to Iu Na Ja Naku 'tte mo) July 24, 2002
 愛ありがとう (Ai Arigatō) c/w 色づく旅路 (Irozuku Tabiji) October 23, 2002
 嵐峡 (Arashihazama) c/w 冬のタンゴ (Fuyu no Tango) January 22, 2003
 ありんことひまわり (Arinko to Himawari) c/w ありんこのクリスマス (Arinko no Christmas) June 25, 2003
 じょんから女節 (Jonkara Onnabushi) c/w たまゆら (Tamayura) June 25, 2003
 おんな炭坑節 (Onna Tankōbushi) May 26, 2004
 嘘だといって (Uso Da to Itte) c/w 芭蕉布 (Bashōfu) January 26, 2005
 洋子の・・・海 (Yōko no...Umi) c/w 洋子の・・・ふるさと (Yōko no Furusato) June 16, 2005
 洋子の・・・名残月 (Yōko no Meizangetsu) c/w 洋子の・・・冬景色 (Yōko no Fuyukeshiki) October 19, 2005

Cover Songs
 In 1988, she covered Johnny Hates Jazz's song "I Don't Want to be a Hero, "反逆のヒーロー". 
 In 1990, she covered Diana Ross's song: "If We Hold On Together", "イフ・ウィ・ホールド・オン・トウゲザー" from the  1988 animated film, The Land Before Time.

References

External links 
 Yoko Nagayama's blog
 Yōko Nagayama's official home page

1968 births
Living people
Singers from Tokyo
Japanese actresses
Japanese women pop singers
Enka singers